Alberta is a feminine given name. It is derived from the Germanic words adal "noble" and beraht "right". Alberta may refer to:

Translations 
 Catalan: Alberta
 Danish: Alberte
 Dutch: Albertina
 French: Albertine
 German: Albertina
 Italian: Alberta
 Polish: Alberta
 Portuguese: Albertina
 Spanish: Alberta
Welsh: Alberta

Notable people named Alberta 
 Princess Louise Caroline Alberta (1848-1939), daughter of Queen Victoria and namesake of the Canadian province
 Alberta of Agen (died 286), Roman martyr
 Alberta, Queen of Castile (fl. 1071), wife of Sancho II
 Alberta Brianti (born 1980), Italian tennis player
 Alberta Gallatin (1861–1948), American stage and film actress
 Alberta Gay (1913–1987), mother of singer Marvin Gaye
 Alberta Hunter (1895–1984), American jazz singer and songwriter
 Alberta Martin (1906–2004), once thought to have been the last surviving widow of a Confederate soldier
 Alberta Montagu, Countess of Sandwich (1877–1951), American heiress and British aristocrat
 Alberta Nelson (1937–2006), American television and film actress
 Alberta Nichols (1898–1957), American songwriter
 Alberta Sheriff, also known as Alberta (singer), a singer from Sierra Leone
 Alberta Vaughn (1904–1992), American silent film actress
 Alberta Watson (1955–2015), Canadian film and television actress
 Alberta Williams King (1904–1974), mother of Martin Luther King Jr.

See also
Albert (given name)
Albert (surname)
Alberta (disambiguation)

References

Feminine given names
English feminine given names